Eslamabad (also Romanized as Eslāmābād; also known as Chahār Man Nīm) is a village in Gol Banu Rural District, Pain Jam District, Torbat-e Jam County, Razavi Khorasan Province, Iran. At the 2006 census, its population was 544, in 126 families.

References 

Populated places in Torbat-e Jam County